Tom Cunningham (born 6 April 1931 in Dungarvan, County Waterford) is an Irish retired sportsperson.  He played hurling with his local club Dungarvan and was a member of the Waterford senior inter-county team in the 1950s and 1960s.

References

1931 births
Living people
Dungarvan hurlers
Waterford inter-county hurlers
Munster inter-provincial hurlers
All-Ireland Senior Hurling Championship winners